This page lists the major power stations located in Henan province.

Non-renewable

Coal based

Natural gas based

Renewable

Hydroelectric

Conventional

Pumped-storage

Wind

Solar

References 

Power stations
Henan